Uyta is a rural locality (a village) in Morzhegorskoye Rural Settlement of Vinogradovsky District, Arkhangelsk Oblast, Russia. The population was 202 as of 2010. There are 6 streets.

Geography 
Uyta is located on the Severnaya Dvina River, 24 km north of Bereznik (the district's administrative centre) by road. Shastki is the nearest rural locality.

References 

Rural localities in Vinogradovsky District